Stenocora is a monotypic genus of damselflies in the family Polythoridae, the bannerwings. It contains the single species Stenocora percornuta, which is known commonly as the horned bannerwing. It is native to Ecuador and Peru. Little is known about the species.

References

Zygoptera genera
Monotypic Odonata genera
Polythoridae
Taxonomy articles created by Polbot